is a Japanese novel written by Baku Yumemakura. An anime adaptation by Madhouse was announced by Japanese anime television network Animax in May 2008 and ran between October and December 2008, spanning a total of 12 episodes.

Plot
The series begins in 12th century Japan and centers on Kuro, a character based loosely on the legendary Japanese swordsman Minamoto no Yoshitsune. Kuro and his servant, Benkei, meet a beautiful and mysterious woman named Kuromitsu while on the run from Kuro's elder brother, who seeks his life. Kuromitsu and Kuro fall in love, but he soon discovers that she harbors a terrible secret: she is a vampiric immortal. Following an attack by his pursuers, Kuro is badly injured and must imbibe Kuromitsu's blood to save his own life. Kuro is then betrayed and attacked by Benkei, who has been subverted by a shadowy organization called the Red Army, and Kuro's head is severed, which interferes with his transformation into a fully immortal being.

Kuro loses consciousness and wakes up centuries later in a post-apocalyptic, dystopian Japan with his memories of the past century missing. The surviving citizens have fallen under constant oppression by the Red Army, and Kuro is quickly found and recruited by an underground revolutionary movement called Haniwa. The remaining episodes follow Kuro's fight with the Red Army and its host of elite warriors, who have been hunting Kuromitsu for her blood, believing it contains the secret to eternal life; focusing on Kuro's quest to find his inexplicably lost love.

In the first few episodes, the story shows Kuro's memories of travelling through the centuries with Kuromitsu with gaps in the recollection indicating lapses in his memory. The recollections show the past up until Kuromitsu goes missing.

The starting plot for the series is probably inspired by Kurozuka, a 1939 Japanese dance-drama, which features a man-eating ogress named Kuromitsu, as well as the life of Minamoto no Yoshitsune.

Characters

Media

Novel
Kurozuka was originally developed as a novel by Baku Yumemakura and it was first published by Shueisha on August 25, 2000. Shueisha republished it in bunkoban format on February 20, 2003, and in digital format on November 1, 2013.

Manga
The Kurozuka manga was adapted from the original novel by author Baku Yumemakura and was illustrated by Takashi Noguchi. Serialized in Shueisha's Oh Super Jump, the series spanned ten volumes. The first was released on January 6, 2003 and the last on December 4, 2006.

Anime
The anime adaptation of Kurozuka is produced by Madhouse and directed by Tetsurō Araki, with Yoshinobu Fujioka, Tsutomu Shirado and Araki himself handling series composition, Masanori Shino designing the characters and Kiyoshi Yoshida composing the music. It began on October 7, 2008, on Animax. The opening theme is "Systematic People" by Wagdug Futuristic Unity with Maximum the Ryo of Maximum the Hormone. The closing theme is "Hanarebanare (ハナレバナレ)" by Shigi. The English dub was produced by Ocean Productions, in Vancouver, British Columbia, Canada, using their own studio actors.

References

External links
 Official Animax Kurozaka anime website 
 

2000 Japanese novels
Animax original programming
Cultural depictions of Minamoto no Yoshitsune
Japanese novels adapted into films
Madhouse (company)
Post-apocalyptic anime and manga
Romance anime and manga
Seinen manga
Shueisha books
Shueisha franchises
Shueisha manga
Supernatural anime and manga
Vampires in anime and manga
Japanese vampire films
Vampire novels